Sin of a Family is a 2011 South Korean crime film, produced by Shin Hyun-joon, about a detective who investigates the circumstances of a young autistic boy's death.

Plot
A body found at a lake is identified by police as Jeong Min-hwan, a young autistic boy, who went missing two months earlier.

While struggling in his troubled relationship with his son Gyeong-su, Detective Jo Chang-shik is assigned to the case. As part of the investigation, he visits the victim's family.

When he eventually unearths their family secrets, he suspects the father may be responsible for Min-hwan's death.

Cast
Shin Hyun-joon as Jo Chang-shik
Jeon No-min asJeong In-su, the father
Wang Heui-ji as Go Yeong-suk, the mother
Lee Ki-woo as Detective Lee
Jeong Weon-jung as Seo, section head
Jo Sang-yeon as Jeong Myeong-hwan, the younger son
Kim So-hyun as Jeong Myeong-heui, the daughter
Park Chang-ik as Jeong Myeong-cheol, the elder son
Oh In-hye as Goh Keum-sook, Yeong-suk's younger sister
Kim Yong-woo as Detective Kim
Lee Jae-wook as Detective Mun
 Kim Young-woong as Detective Park
Noh Young-hak as Jo Gyeong-su, Chang-shik's son
Choi Jong-hun as young man in neighbourhood

Release
Sin of a Family was premiered at the 2010 Puchon Fantastic Film Festival.

References

External links
 

South Korean crime films
South Korean mystery films
2011 films
2011 crime films
2010s South Korean films
2010s Korean-language films